Carlos Morel may refer to:

 Carlos Morel (footballer) (born 1987), Argentine goalkeeper
 Carlos Morel (painter) (1813–1894), Argentine painter